Away Is Mine is the seventh solo studio album by Gord Downie. It was released posthumously on October 16, 2020, and recorded over four days in July 2017, three months before he died. It is a double album, with one disc containing electric versions of the songs, and the other acoustic.

The album was produced by Nyles Spencer. It sold well in Canada, earning a #3 Billboard Canada chart debut with the #1 spot on the Top Albums, Vinyl, and Digital Albums charts.

Regarding the release, Spill Magazine's John Graham laments, "Away Is Mine serves as a reminder that Downie, our dear friend gone far too soon, gave everything he could musically, before the inevitability of his death."

Track listing
All tracks written by Gord Downie and Josh Finlayson.

References

2020 albums
Gordon Downie albums
Arts & Crafts Productions albums
Albums published posthumously